Matthew Sweeney was a poet.

Matt(hew) Sweeney may also refer to:

Matt Sweeney, musician
Matt Sweeney (special effects artist), visual effects artist of Apollo 13
Matthew Sweeney (baseball), see 2009 in baseball
Matt Sweeney (athlete) on List of Australian athletics champions